Second League of Serbia and Montenegro 2003–04 (Serbian: Druga savezna liga) consisted of four groups of 10 teams. The competition started on 17 August 2003 and the regular season ended on June 13, 2004.

Changes for next season

The next season, second level in Serbia and Montenegro football consisted of two groups. Therefore, as the end of season, Serbian groups (North, East & West) merged into Serbian Second League (Druga liga Srbija), and South group formed the Montenegrin Second League (Druga liga Crna Gora).

League table

North

East

West

South (Montenegro)

Serbian leagues playoffs

Montenegrin league playoff

First leg

Second leg 

Mornar qualified to 2004–05 Montenegrin First League, while Lovćen remained a member of Second League.

References 

Second League of Serbia and Montenegro
2003–04 in Serbian football
2003–04 in Montenegrin football
Serbia